George Ihler (born March 4, 1943) is a former American football player and coach.  Ihler was the head football coach at Saginaw Valley State University  in University Center, Michigan for 11 seasons, from 1983 until 1993. He won eight Saginaw Valley League titles and a Class A state championship in 1973 when his Lumberjacks were undefeated and unscored upon (443-0). His coaching record at Saginaw Valley State was 61–52–1.  He is a native of Marinette, Wisconsin and attended Marinette High School.

References

1943 births
Living people
Saginaw Valley State Cardinals football coaches
Western Michigan Broncos football players
High school football coaches in Michigan
People from Marinette, Wisconsin